M v Home Office [1993] UKHL 5 is a UK constitutional law case concerning the rule of law.

Facts
An action for judicial review of the actions of the Home Secretary was brought by M, a deported teacher from Zaire. The Home Secretary, Kenneth Baker, had been told by the High Court to return a Zaire teacher to the United Kingdom on refugee status, after being deported.

Judgment

Court of Appeal
Nolan LJ held that the teacher had to be returned, and said the following.

House of Lords
The House of Lords held that the Home Secretary acted in contempt of court, and had to return the teacher.

Lord Templeman said the following:

See also

United Kingdom constitutional law

References

United Kingdom constitutional case law